Tomáš Svoboda (December 6, 1939 – November 17, 2022) was a French-born Czech-American contemporary classical composer and pianist, whose debut took place in Prague, Czechoslovakia on September 7, 1957, with the world premiere of his Symphony No. 1 (Of Nature) with the FOK Prague Symphony conducted by Václav Smetáček. Svoboda's catalog contains over 200 compositions, including six symphonies and five concerti. His music is performed worldwide and recordings of more than 50 works have now been released. Svoboda's Piano Trios CD recording received a 2001 "Critics Choice Award" from the American Record Guide and his Marimba Concerto received recognition in a 2003 Grammy Award nomination for the Oregon Symphony.

Biography
Svoboda was born in Paris, France. A Professor Emeritus from Portland State University, Svoboda composed his first music at age nine. He was a professor at PSU for 27 years. There have been over 1,200 performances of his music.

Svoboda died in Portland, Oregon on November 17, 2022, at the age of 82. He had suffered a major stroke in 2012.

Works

Selected recordings
 Children's Treasure Box, Vols. 1-4, for Piano, North Pacific Music (NPM LD 026), Recording by Tomas Svoboda.
 Chamber Works, Vol. 1, With Clarinet, North Pacific Music (NPM LD 016), Recording by members of Oregon Festival of American Music & Tomas Svoboda.
 Four Visions, Music for 1, 2 & 3 Pianos, North Pacific Music (NPM LD 013), Recording by Daniel Wiesner, David Svec & Tomas Svoboda.
 Nine Etudes in Fugue Style, Vols. 1 & 2, for Piano, North Pacific Music (NPM LD 015), Recording by Tomas Svoboda.
 Orchestral Works by Tomas Svoboda, Albany Records: Troy 604, Recording by the Oregon Symphony.
 Piano Concertos, Artisie 4 Recordings, (1006), Recording by the Dayton Philharmonic.
 Piano Trios, North Pacific Music (NPM LD 008), Recording by Lubomír Havlák, Jitka Vasankova & Tomáš Svoboda.
 Piano Works, Vol. 1, for Piano, North Pacific Music (NPM LD 006), Recording by Tomáš Svoboda.
 String Quartets, Vols.1 and 2, North Pacific Music (NPM LD 022), Recording by the Martinů Quartet.

References

External links
 Tomas Svoboda Official Website
 Oregon Public Broadcasting, Oregon Art Beat episode of Thursday April 6, 2006 featured Mr. Svoboda and his wife, Jana.
 

1939 births
2022 deaths
20th-century classical composers
20th-century Czech male musicians
21st-century classical pianists
21st-century Czech male musicians
Concert band composers
Czech classical composers
Czech classical pianists
Czech male classical composers
Czech music educators
Male classical pianists
Musicians from Paris